Xiandai Hanyu Cidian, also known as A Dictionary of Current Chinese or Contemporary Chinese Dictionary is an important one-volume dictionary of Standard Mandarin Chinese published by the Commercial Press, now into its 7th (2016) edition.  It was originally edited by Lü Shuxiang and Ding Shengshu as a reference work on modern Standard Mandarin Chinese. Compilation started in 1958 and trial editions were issued in 1960 and 1965, with a number of copies printed in 1973 for internal circulation and comments, but due to the Cultural Revolution the final draft was not completed until the end of 1977, and the first formal edition was not published until December 1978. It was the first People's Republic of China dictionary to be arranged according to Hanyu Pinyin, the phonetic standard for  Standard Mandarin Chinese, with explanatory notes in simplified Chinese. The subsequent second through seventh editions were respectively published in 1983 (Reorganized Edition- now seen as the '2nd edition'), 1996 (Revised Edition- now seen as the '3rd edition'), 2002 (2002 Supplemental Edition- now seen as the '4th edition'), 2005 (5th edition), 2012 (6th edition) and 2016 (7th edition).

In 1994, A Dictionary of Current Chinese won China's First National Book Award.  The seventh edition contains about 70,000 entries including characters, words and expressions, idiomatic phrases and idioms.  The dictionary is also available in digital format on CD-ROMs and Traditional Chinese digital versions.

Xiandai Hanyu Cidian was consulted in the writing of The First Series of Standardized Forms of Words with Non-standardized Variant Forms.

Editions

New entries in the 6th edition

Traditional Chinese edition

A traditional Chinese edition was published in 2001 by the Commercial Press (Hong Kong). It contains about 60,000 entries, with all entries labeled with Zhuyin alongside Hanyu Pinyin.

Controversies 
Xiandai Hanyu Cidian had given discriminatory explanations to certain words and phrases. An example was the word "homosexuality". From the first edition in the 1970s (the entry in that edition is   - literally 'same-sex love') to the fifth edition in 2005 of Xiandai Hanyu Cidian, the definition of the term had been "determined" as "a type of psychological perversion". In the 2012 6th edition & 2016 7th edition, the term was redefined as "sexual behaviour between persons of the same sex".

In the sixth edition, even though it contains a large number of new vocabulary, the word   ("comrade") which is an informal term for "a homosexual person", was not included in the dictionary. This could be because the term is often construed as a sarcastic reference to the Communist Party of China, according to Sociology Professor  of the Hong Kong University of Science and Technology. The original term is a common form of political address in China, e.g. Comrade Hu Jintao, Comrade Wen Jiabao.

The act of using English vocabulary in the main body of a Chinese dictionary, and using English to substitute for Chinese characters, according to these detractors, will cause the greatest damage to the Chinese characters since the romanization of Chinese, and will have a long-term negative impact on the language.

The publisher, the Commercial Press, replied that the section is meant just for easy references when looking up the dictionary. The Commercial Press says that according to a rule stated in a 2010 document by the State Council Office Secretariat, alphabetical entries recorded in Chinese dictionaries written by state authorities did not have corresponding Chinese translations. Hence, it is absolutely fine to include them in dictionaries.

See also 
 Dai Kan-Wa Jiten
 Han-Han Dae Sajeon
 Hanyu Da Zidian
 Xiandai Hanyu Guifan Cidian
 Zhongwen Da Cidian

Notes

References

Citations

Sources 

 Fifty years - A Dictionary of Current Chinese. .

External links 
 Official website
 3,000 New Entries Added to the Most Popular Chinese Dictionary

Commercial Press
Chinese dictionaries